Fosen is a traditional district in Trøndelag, consisting of the municipalities Osen, Roan Åfjord, Ørland, Indre Fosen, Orkland, Heim, Hitra and Frøya. The district is dominated by forested valleys, lakes, coastal cliffs but also shallow areas, and in the interior mountains reaching up to 675 m elevation. The western coast has many skerries and some islands, such as Stokkøya in Åfjord. There are some good salmon rivers, and sea eagles and other sea birds are very common along the coast, notably on the shallow area near Ørland (Grandefjæra). The west coast has mild winters, and some locations (just west of the mountains) receive on average more than 2,000 mm of precipitation per year. Part of the Scandinavian coastal conifer forests (No: Kystgranskog) are located in the valleys of the peninsula, and smaller areas are classified as temperate rainforest with 67 nature reserves. The largest nature reserve is Øyenskavelen (5,316 hectare), with many nature types including undisturbed forest, some of it classified as rainforest. 

Fosen also has a folk high school, Fosen Folkehøgskole. It teaches unusual subjects such as sailing and building traditional Norwegian boats (close to Viking ships), organic agriculture, traditional Norwegian arts and crafts, nature life, etc. 

The Fosen Conflict (simple English:) is an ongoing conflict regarding environmentalism. The Supreme Court ruled that wind turbines (on Fosen) have been built unlawfully. The Supreme Court ruled in October 2021 that the wind turbines (on Fosen), violate the indigenous rights of the Sámi people. The Fosen Conflict has resulted in civil disobedience; in 2023, Greta Thunberg and others were blocking entrances to (government) ministries in Oslo; the police moved them out of the way. On March 2, 2023, protesters were blocking entrances to (government) ministries in Oslo; protesters were arrested, brought to ["the central arrest (facility)"] sentralarresten and given a fine. On Svalbard, students at the folk high school protested the visit of the prime minister; and walls at the school, were covered with protests [or messages of protest]. In the afternoon, the president of the Sami Parliament (Norway) and the Minister of Energy had a meeting; they held a press conference, following the meeting; the minister said that he apologised on behalf of the Cabinet (Norway) - for the violation of human rights, that had happened, in regard to [the decisions resulting from the case work,] konsesjonsvedtakene. The same afternoon, the prime minister wrote that today the Cabinet is apologising to the Sami practitioners (at Fosen) of reindeer husbandry (reindriftsamene) , for the violations of their human rights, because of the significant negative impact on those practitioners' opportunities to practice their culture. In the evening, the prime minister met (in a church), with some of the young[er] protesters. Later that evening, the spokeswoman for the protesters that attended that meeting, said that there are "demands of ours" that must be fulfilled immediately; furthermore, a final decision has to be made, and "our demand" is that the wind turbines (at Fosen) be dismantled, and the [use of] the land, returned to the Sami at Fosen, she said.  The prime minister invited the Sami practitioners (at Fosen) of reindeer husbandry, for a breakfast (on 3 March); practitioners (from Fosen) and the prime minister and a few other politicians had a breakfast meeting (at Statsministerens kontor). Around 15 minutes after the end of the breakfast meeting, one of the leading protesters, called off the 8-day long protest; however, [a few hundred people,] activists [and supporters] gathered at "royal palace's square" for a low-key sit-down. On 3 March, the prime minister admitted that a violation of human rights, is going on. On 9 March, during the prime mininster's visit to the Sami Parliament (in Norway), the prime minister said that he will take the Fosen Conflict seriously, (moving) forward. As of Q1 2023, the reindeer owners  at Fosen are still willing to negotiate a time period in which the wind turbines would be allowed to stay (before being disassembled); a time period of less than 25 years (since construction), is something the reindeer owners are willing to consider.

The name
The district is named after the island Storfosna ('Big Fosen') in Ørland. The Old Norse form of the name was Fólgsn. For the meaning see Kristiansund.

See also
Fosenlinjen

References 

 
Districts of Trøndelag
Peninsulas of Trøndelag